The  is a 1950 mystery fiction novel by a Japanese novelist, Tetsuya Ayukawa. It is Ayukawa’s debut novel, and is based on memories and experiences from Ayukawa’s childhood in Manchuria. The story was also the first in a long series of novels featuring the same protagonist, “Detective Onitsura”.

Story outline
Set in Manchukuo before World War II, Detective Onitsura, formerly of the Tokyo Metropolitan Police is assigned to Harbin, which has a large cosmopolitan population creating unique problems and difficulties for the police. He then must travel to Dalian, to investigate the murder of a rich Russian émigré at a summer home near Ganjungzi in the Kwantung Leased Territory. His investigations take him to Port Arthur, and back to Harbin on the Asia Express, an express train on the South Manchurian Railway. Along the way, he must solve the case by overcoming the suspects' false alibis. The climax of the story is set on an island in the Songhua River.

Main characters
 Ivan Petrov - a rich White Russian émigré
 Anton Petrov - Ivan's nephew
 Guo Yunhuan - Anton's fiancé
 Nikolai Petrov - also Ivan's nephew
 Alexander Petrov - also Ivan's nephew
 Natalia Bacour - Alexander's fiancé
 Detective Onitsura - a Dalian Police detective, on assignment from Tokyo Metropolitan Police Department
 Detective Sayabin - a Harbin Police detective

Awards
The novel won a contest sponsored in 1949 by the popular mystery magazine Hoseki (“Jewel”) with a grand prize of one million yen to mark its third anniversary of publication.

See also
Freeman Wills Crofts

Japanese mystery novels
1950 novels
Novels set in Manchukuo
Novels set in Heilongjiang
Novels set in Liaoning